Emmanuel Addoquaye Pappoe (also spelled Pappoa, born 3 March 1981 in Accra) is a former Ghanaian professional footballer who played as a defender.

Club career 
Pappoe was born in Accra. Prior to joining AEK Larnaca in summer 2007, Pappoe plied his trade in the Israeli Premier League, playing two seasons each with F.C. Ashdod (2003–05), Hapoel Kfar Saba (2005–07) and Hapoel Haifa until December 2009. He left Beitar Shimshon Tel Aviv of the Israeli Liga Leumit in October 2010 and returned to his youth club Liberty Professionals F.C.

International career 
Pappoe was part of the Ghanaian 2004 Olympic football team who exited in the first round, having finished in third place in group B. His hard work earned him a call-up to the senior side, making his debut against Sierra Leone on 19 October 2002. 

He was selected to represent the nation at the 2006 FIFA World Cup, where he made two appearances in four matches, as the unfancied Africans bowed out to world powers Brazil in the round-of-16 match.

Honours

International
Ghana
FIFA World Youth Championship runner-up: 2001

References

External links
2006 World Cup Profile
One.co.il profile and stats 

1981 births
Living people
Association football defenders
Ghanaian footballers
Israeli Premier League players
Cypriot First Division players
Liga Leumit players
Liberty Professionals F.C. players
F.C. Ashdod players
Hapoel Kfar Saba F.C. players
AEK Larnaca FC players
Hapoel Haifa F.C. players
Beitar Tel Aviv Bat Yam F.C. players
Ghana under-20 international footballers
Ghana international footballers
Olympic footballers of Ghana
Footballers at the 2004 Summer Olympics
2006 Africa Cup of Nations players
2006 FIFA World Cup players
Ghanaian expatriate footballers
Expatriate footballers in Israel
Expatriate footballers in Cyprus